Ivan Pecha (born 23 January 1986) is a Slovak football player who plays as a defender for ASK Kematen.

Career
Previously he played for Neman Grodno and BATE Borisov in Belarus, Khazar Lankaran in Azerbaijan, Ceahlăul Piatra Neamț in Romania and Senec and Slovan Bratislava in Slovakia.

In February 2008, Pecha joined Ceahlăul Piatra Neamţ before moving to BATE Borisov on loan in August 2008.

In July 2013, Pecha returned to Azerbaijan, signing a one-year contract with Ravan Baku. During the winter break, Ravan decided to release Pecha, 
and he moved to FK Liepāja with fellow Ravan Baku player Cristián Torres.

At the end of July 2014, Pecha moved from FK Liepāja to Liga I side Oțelul Galați.

In January 2015, Pecha moved to Estonia, signing with Levadia Tallinn. In July, Levadia cancelled the contract with Pecha.

On 11 August 2016, he signed a contract with Polish club Motor Lublin.

On 23 November 2016, Ivan signed a contract with CD Torrevieja, a Spanish team in the tercera division.

Career statistics

Honours
Levadia Tallinn
 Estonian Supercup (1): 2015

References

External links
 evz.ro 
 
 

1986 births
Living people
Slovak footballers
Association football defenders
Slovak expatriate footballers
Expatriate footballers in Romania
Expatriate footballers in Belarus
Expatriate footballers in Azerbaijan
Expatriate footballers in Latvia
Expatriate footballers in Estonia
Expatriate footballers in Poland
Expatriate footballers in Spain
Expatriate footballers in Lithuania
Expatriate footballers in the Czech Republic
Expatriate footballers in Austria
Slovak expatriate sportspeople in Romania
Slovak expatriate sportspeople in Belarus
Slovak expatriate sportspeople in Azerbaijan
Slovak expatriate sportspeople in Latvia
Slovak expatriate sportspeople in Estonia
Slovak expatriate sportspeople in Poland
Slovak expatriate sportspeople in Spain
Slovak expatriate sportspeople in Lithuania
Slovak expatriate sportspeople in the Czech Republic
Slovak expatriate sportspeople in Austria
Liga I players
Meistriliiga players
ŠK Slovan Bratislava players
FC Senec players
CSM Ceahlăul Piatra Neamț players
FC BATE Borisov players
Khazar Lankaran FK players
FC Neman Grodno players
Ravan Baku FC players
FK Liepāja players
ASC Oțelul Galați players
FCI Levadia Tallinn players
Motor Lublin players
CD Torrevieja players
Ciudad de Murcia footballers
FK Atlantas players
Footballers from Bratislava